The 59th Brigade was a formation of British Army. It was part of the new army also known as Kitchener's Army. It was assigned to the 20th (Light) Division and served on the Western Front during the First World War.

Formation
The infantry battalions did not all serve at once, but all were assigned to the brigade during the war.
10th Battalion, King's Royal Rifle Corps
11th Battalion, King's Royal Rifle Corps
10th Battalion, Rifle Brigade
11th Battalion, Rifle Brigade 	
59th Machine Gun Company
59th Trench Mortar Battery
2nd Battalion, Cameronians (Scottish Rifles)

References

Infantry brigades of the British Army in World War I